Cylindrophora is a genus of beetles in the family Buprestidae, containing the following species:

 Cylindrophora auronotata (Bily, 1978)
 Cylindrophora mrazi (Obenberger, 1932)

References

Buprestidae genera